Donnas (Valdôtain:  or ; Issime) is a town and comune in the Aosta Valley region of northwestern Italy.

Cities and towns in Aosta Valley